The Arsenal O.101 was a French research aircraft that flew shortly after World War II. It was a low-wing monoplane of conventional configuration with fixed tailwheel undercarriage, but incorporated several novel features for its role as an airborne testbed for evaluating airfoil sections and control surface designs. It was designed to accommodate a pilot and an observer in tandem cockpits. However, since the observer was to be watching the aircraft's wings, this cockpit was sunken fully into the fuselage, affording no fore-and-aft view at all. The pilot's cockpit was set well back along the fuselage, near the tail.

The O.101 was fitted with extensive instrumentation to measure pressures and loads throughout the aircraft, and was given dimensions such that the entire aircraft could be placed inside the wind tunnel at Chalais-Meudon without any disassembly required.

Specifications

References

 
 
 

1940s French experimental aircraft
O101
Single-engined tractor aircraft
Low-wing aircraft